Mandalay Region Hluttaw is the legislature of the Mandalay Region in Myanmar (Burma). It is a unicameral body, consisting of 76 members, including 57 elected members and 19 military representatives. As of February 2016, the Hluttaw was led by speaker Aung Kyaw Oo of the National League for Democracy (NLD).

As of the 2015 general election, the National League for Democracy (NLD) won the most contested seats in the legislature, based on the most recent election results.

General Election results (Nov. 2015)

See also
State and Region Hluttaws
Pyidaungsu Hluttaw
Amyotha Hluttaw
Pyithu Hluttaw

References

External links
Official website

Unicameral legislatures
Mandalay Region
Legislatures of Burmese states and regions